Turbonilla pupoides is a species of sea snail, a marine gastropod mollusk in the family Pyramidellidae, the pyrams and their allies.

Distribution
This species occurs in the following locations:
 Aruba
 Belize
 Bonaire
 Caribbean Sea
 Cayman Islands
 Colombia
 Cuba
 Curaçao
 Gulf of Mexico
 Jamaica
 Lesser Antilles
 Panama
 Puerto Rico

Notes
Additional information regarding this species:
 Habitat: Known from seamounts and knolls

References

External links
 To Biodiversity Heritage Library (10 publications)
 To Encyclopedia of Life
 To USNM Invertebrate Zoology Mollusca Collection
 To ITIS
 To World Register of Marine Species

pupoides
Gastropods described in 1841